Hugh James Grogan (September 3, 1872 – July 6, 1950) was a Canadian-born American lacrosse player who competed in the 1904 Summer Olympics. In 1904 he was member of the St. Louis Amateur Athletic Association which won the silver medal in the lacrosse tournament.

Notes

References

External links
 
 

1872 births
1950 deaths
American lacrosse players
Olympic silver medalists for the United States in lacrosse
Lacrosse players at the 1904 Summer Olympics
Medalists at the 1904 Summer Olympics